The New Party was a political party briefly active in the United Kingdom in the early 1930s.  It was formed by Sir Oswald Mosley, an MP who had belonged to both the Conservative and Labour parties, quitting Labour after its 1930 conference narrowly rejected his "Mosley Memorandum", a document he had written outlining how he would deal with the problem of unemployment.

Mosley Memorandum
On 6 December 1930, Mosley published an expanded version of the "Mosley Memorandum", which was signed by Mosley, his wife and fellow Labour MP Lady Cynthia and 15 other Labour MPs: Oliver Baldwin, Joseph Batey, Aneurin Bevan, W. J. Brown, William Cove, Robert Forgan, J. F. Horrabin, James Lovat-Fraser, John McGovern, John James McShane, Frank Markham, H. T. Muggeridge, Morgan Philips Price, Charles Simmons, and John Strachey. It was also signed by A. J. Cook, general secretary of the Miners' Federation of Great Britain.

Founding the New Party

On 28 February 1931 Mosley resigned from the Labour Party, launching the New Party the following day. The party was formed from six of the Labour MPs who signed the Mosley Manifesto (Mosley and his wife, Baldwin, Brown, Forgan and Strachey), although two (Baldwin and Brown) resigned membership after a day and sat in the House of Commons as independent MPs; Strachey resigned in June. The party received £50,000 funding from Lord Nuffield and launched a magazine called Action, edited by Harold Nicolson. In addition, Nicolson produced a New Party propaganda film titled Crisis and aimed to get it shown in the cinemas but the censors banned the film as it was considered it would "bring Parliament into disrepute" due to its depiction of MPs asleep on the benches. In the event the film was only shown at New Party meetings.
Mosley also set up a party militia, the "Biff Boys" led by the England rugby captain Peter Howard.

The New Party's first electoral contest was at the Ashton-under-Lyne by-election in April 1931. The candidate was Allan Young, and his election agent was Wilfred Risdon. With a threadbare organisation they polled some 16% of the vote, splitting the Labour vote and allowing a Conservative to be returned to the Commons. Two more MPs joined the New Party later in 1931: W. E. D. Allen from the Unionists and Cecil Dudgeon from the Liberals. At the 1931 general election the New Party contested 25 seats, but only Mosley himself, and a candidate in Merthyr Tydfil (Sellick Davies stood against only one Independent Labour Party (ILP) candidate in Merthyr, while Mosley stood against both Conservative and Labour candidates in Stoke) polled a decent number of votes, and three candidates lost their deposits. Mosley's New Party general election campaign received prominent press coverage in various national newspapers during 1931 with The Manchester Guardian reporting that "The stewards were wearing rosettes of black and amber – the Mosley colours. Busy bees, hiving the honey of prosperity? That may be the symbolism of it."

Policies
The New Party programme was built on the "Mosley Memorandum", advocating a national policy to meet the economic crisis that the Great Depression had brought. His desire for complete control of policy making decisions in the New Party led many members to resign membership. He favoured granting wide powers to the government, with only general control by Parliament, and creating a five-member Cabinet without specific portfolio, similar to the War Cabinet adopted during the First World War. His economic strategy broadly followed Keynesian thinking and suggested widespread investment into housing to provide work and improve housing standards overall and also supporting protectionism with proposals for high tariff walls.

Demise
After the election, Mosley toured Europe and became convinced of the virtues of fascism. Gradually, the New Party became more authoritarian, with parts of it, notably its youth movement NUPA, adopting overtly fascist thinking and the wearing of "Greyshirt" uniforms. The New Party's sharp turn to fascism led previous supporters such as John Strachey and Harold Nicolson to leave it. In 1932, Mosley united most of the various British fascist organisations to form the British Union of Fascists into which the New Party subsumed itself. Out of the Scottish section was formed the Scottish Democratic Fascist Party, headed by William Weir Gilmour.

An unrelated New Party was launched in Britain in 2003.

Election results

By-elections, 1929–1931

1931 UK general election

References

Sources 
Benewick R.  The Fascist Movement in Britain (1972)
 Dorril,  Stephen. Blackshirt, Viking Publishing, 2006  
 Mandle, W.F. "The New Party," Historical Studies. Australia and New Zealand Vol.XII. Issue 47 (1966)
 Pugh, Martin. Hurrah for the Blackshirts!': Fascists and Fascism in Britain between the Wars, Random House, 2005, 
 Skidelsky, Robert "The Problem of Mosley. Why a Fascist Failed," Encounter (1969) 33#192 pp 77–88.
 Skidelsky, Robert. Oswald Mosley (1975), the standard scholarly biography
 Mosley, Oswald. My Life (1968)
 Worley, Matthew. Oswald Mosley and the New Party,  Palgrave Macmillan, 2010,

Primary sources
 Mosley, Oswald. A National Policy 1931
 Mosley, Oswald. Unemployment 1931
 Mosley, Oswald. The National Crisis 1931
 Mosley, Oswald; Mosley, Cynthia; Strachey, John; Baldwin, Oliver; Forgan, Robert; Allen, W.E.D. Why We Left The Old Parties 1931
 Davies, Sellick. Why I Joined The New Party 1931
 Joad, C.E.M. The Case For The New Party 1931
 MacDougall, James Dunlop. Disillusionment 1931
 Diston, Adam Marshall. The Sleeping Sickness of the Labour Party 1931
 Diston, Adam Marshall; Forgan, Robert. The New Party and the I.L.P. 1931
 Allen, W.E.D.  The New Party and the Old Toryism 1931

Defunct political parties in the United Kingdom
Labour Party (UK) breakaway groups
Oswald Mosley
Political parties established in 1931
Political parties disestablished in 1932
1931 establishments in the United Kingdom
Syncretic political movements